Stephen Russell Davies  (born 27 April 1963), better known as Russell T Davies, is a Welsh screenwriter and television producer whose works include Queer as Folk, The Second Coming, Casanova, the 2005 revival of the BBC One science fiction franchise Doctor Who, Cucumber, A Very English Scandal, Years and Years, It's a Sin and Nolly.

Born in Swansea, Davies had aspirations as a comic artist before focusing on being a playwright and screenwriter. After graduating from Oxford University, he joined the BBC's children's department, CBBC, in 1985 on a part-time basis and held various positions, which included creating two series, Dark Season and Century Falls. He eventually left the BBC for Granada Television, and in 1994 began writing adult television drama. His early scripts generally explored concepts of religion and sexuality among various backdrops: Revelations was a soap opera about organised religion and featured a lesbian vicar; Springhill was a soap drama about a Catholic family in contemporary Liverpool; The Grand explored society's opinion of subjects such as prostitution, abortion and homosexuality during the interwar period; and Queer as Folk recreated his experiences in the Manchester gay scene. His work in the 2000s included Bob & Rose, which portrayed a gay man who fell in love with a woman; The Second Coming, which focused on the second coming and deicide of Jesus Christ from a mostly non-religious point of view; Mine All Mine, a comedy about a family who discover they own the entire city of Swansea; and Casanova, an adaptation of the complete memoirs of Venetian adventurer Giacomo Casanova.

Following the show's sixteen-year hiatus, Davies revived and ran Doctor Who for the period between 2005 and 2010, with Christopher Eccleston and later David Tennant in the title role. Davies' tenure as executive producer of the show saw a surge in popularity which led to the production of two spin-off series, Torchwood and The Sarah Jane Adventures, and the revival of Saturday prime-time dramas as a profitable venture for production companies. Davies was appointed Officer of the Order of the British Empire in 2008 for services to drama, which coincided with the announcement he would step down from Doctor Who as the show's executive producer with his final script, "The End of Time" (2009–2010). Davies moved to Los Angeles in 2009, where he oversaw production of Torchwood: Miracle Day and the fifth and final series of The Sarah Jane Adventures. Davies returned as Doctor Who showrunner in October 2022 after the departure of Chris Chibnall; the first episodes of his second tenure will be the show's sixtieth anniversary specials in 2023.

After his partner developed cancer in late 2011, Davies returned to the UK. He co-created the CBBC science fantasy drama Wizards vs Aliens, and created Cucumber, a Channel 4 series about middle-aged gay men in the Manchester gay scene; Banana, an E4 series about young LGBT people in the Cucumber universe; and Tofu, an All 4 documentary series which discussed LGBT issues. Davies' later work for BBC One in the 2010s include A Midsummer Night's Dream, a television film adaptation of William Shakespeare's play; A Very English Scandal, a miniseries adaptation of John Preston's novel of the same name; and Years and Years, a drama series which follows a Manchester family affected by political, economic, and technological changes to Britain over 15 years. Davies returned to Channel 4 for a third time in 2021 as creator of It's a Sin, a semi-autobiographical drama about the HIV/AIDS crisis of the 1980s and 1990s.

Early life
Stephen Russell Davies was born on 27 April 1963 at Mount Pleasant Hospital in Swansea. His father, Vivian Davies (1925–2015), and his mother, Barbara (1929–1999), were teachers. Davies was the youngest of three children and their only son. Because he was born by caesarean section, his mother was placed on a morphine drip and was institutionalised after an overdose resulted in a psychotic episode. He described his mother's experience as "literally ... like science fiction" and an early inspiration for his writing career. As a child, Davies was almost always referred to by his middle name. He grew up in a household that "never switched the TV off" until after closedown, and he subsequently became immersed in dramas such as I, Claudius and Doctor Who. One of his first memories, at the age of three, was the 1966 Doctor Who serial The Tenth Planet. He was also an avid cartoonist and comics enthusiast, and purchased series such as Asterix and Peanuts.

Davies attended Tycoch Primary School in Sketty and enrolled at Olchfa School aged 11. In his first year, the main school buildings were closed for rebuilding after inspectors discovered the high alumina cement used in construction had caused other public buildings to collapse. Lessons were instead held in portable buildings, which influenced Davies' imagination to create mystery, science-fiction, and conspiracy thriller stories about the main building. He also immersed himself in books such as Sons and Lovers by D. H. Lawrence and The Crystal Mouse by Babs H. Deal; the latter influenced him so much he could "see it echoing in anything" he wrote. At age 14, he auditioned for and joined the newly formed West Glamorgan Youth Theatre Company (WGYTC). The group's founder and director, Godfrey Evans, considered him to be "a total all-rounder" who was talented and popular with the other students. Working with the group allowed him to define his sexual identity, and he embarked on a several-month relationship with fellow youth actor Rhian Morgan. He later came out as homosexual in his teenage years.

In 1979, Davies completed his O-Levels and stayed at Olchfa with the ambition to study English literature at the University of Oxford; he abandoned his aspirations of becoming a comic artist after a careers advisor convinced him that his colour-blindness would make that path unlikely. During his studies, he participated in the WGYTC's assignments to create Welsh language drama to be performed at the National Eisteddfod of Wales; two such productions were Pair Dadeni, a play based on the Mabinogion myth cycle, and Perthyn, a drama about community belonging and identity in early-1980s West Glamorgan. In 1981, he was accepted by Worcester College, Oxford to study English literature. At Oxford, he realised he was enamoured with the narrative aspect of fiction, especially 19th-century literature such as Charles Dickens.

Davies continued to submit scripts to the WGYT during his studies at Oxford, including Box, a play about the influence of television which Evans noted contained Davies' penchants for misdirecting the audience and mixing comedy and drama; In Her Element, which centred on the animation of still objects; and Hothouse, an Alan Bennett-inspired piece about internal politics in an advertising office. In 1984, he made his final performance for the WGYT and signed up for a course in Theatre Studies at Cardiff University after he graduated from Oxford. He worked sporadically for the Sherman Theatre's publicity department and claimed unemployment benefit in the interim. In 1985, Davies began his professional television career after a friend suggested he should talk to a television producer who was seeking a temporary graphic artist for the children's show Why Don't You?

Children's television career (1985–1993) 
Davies was taken on as a member of the BBC Wales children's department (CBBC) in 1985 and given one-day contracts and commissions, such as illustrating for Why Don't You?. As he was only given three days of work per month by the BBC, he continued to freelance and volunteer for the Sherman Theatre. In 1986, he was approached by the Sunday Sport before its launch to provide a football-themed daily strip; he declined because he was concerned about the pornographic content of the newspaper. He submitted a script for Crossroads in response to an appeal for new writers; it was not used because the show was cancelled in 1987. He ultimately abandoned his graphic art career entirely when he realised in his early twenties that he enjoyed writing the dialogue of a comic more than creating the art.

On 1 June 1987, Davies made his first and only appearance as a television presenter on Play School alongside regular presenter Chloë Ashcroft. Why Don't You? line producer Peter Charlton suggested that he would "be good on camera" and advised him to take his career public. Davies was granted the opportunity for sporadic appearances over a period of six months; he hosted only one episode as a storytelling illustrator before he walked off the set and commented he was "not doing that again". The appearance remains an in-joke in the industry, and the recordings were invariably requested for wrap parties Davies attended.

On Why Don't You?, Davies held various jobs including: researcher, director, illustrator, assistant floor manager and unofficial publicist for fan-mail. He was offered his first professional scriptwriting job in 1986 by producer Dave Evans; he had entered Evans's office to collect his wages and was offered an extra £100 to write a replacement script. Davies' script was positively received by the CBBC and led to increasingly larger roles which culminated in a six-month contract to write for the show after it relocated to Manchester in 1988. He worked for the show for two more years and became the show's producer. He oversaw an increase in drama which tripled its audience—despite the fact BBC Manchester was not permitted by the corporation to create children's dramas—which reached its climax with his last episode: a drama where the Why Don't You? protagonists, led by the show's longest running presenter Ben Slade, were trapped in a café by a supercomputer which tried to kill them.

While producing Why Don't You?, Davies branched out within CBBC at BBC Manchester: he attended directors' courses; wrote for older audiences with his contributions to DEF II and On the Waterfront; and accompanied Keith Chegwin to Norway to assist in the production of a children's documentary about politics. The head of CBBC, Ed Pugh, offered him the chance to produce Breakfast Serials, a new series scheduled for an 8:00 am slot. Breakfast Serials incorporated elements of non-sequitur comedy and popular culture references aimed at older children, such as a parody of Land of the Giants. He decided to leave CBBC during the production of Breakfast Serials: a friend called him after the first episode was transmitted and observed he had "broadcast a joke about the juvenilia of Emily Brontë at eight o'clock in the morning"; the conversation caused him to reflect he was writing for the wrong audience. Davies worked as a writer on three more children's series while he pursued an adult drama career, creating Dark Season and Century Falls, and writing for Children's Ward.

Dark Season and Century Falls

During his tenure on Why Don't You?, Davies oversaw the production of a story that took place in Loch Ness. The story was the precursor for his first freelance children's project: Dark Season. The show, originally called The Adventuresome Three, would feature the Why Don't You? characters in a purely dramatic setting influenced by his childhood. He submitted the script to the head of CBBC, Anna Home, and Granada Television. Both companies were interested in producing the show with minor changes: Granada wished to produce it as one six-part serial, as opposed to Davies' plan of two three-part serials; and Home was interested in accepting the show on the condition it included a new cast of characters. He accepted Home's offer, and the show was allocated the budget and timeslot of Maid Marian and her Merry Men, which had been put on hiatus the year before.

The first three episodes of Dark Season feature three young teenagers in a contemporary secondary school, Reet (Kate Winslet), Marcie (Victoria Lambert), and Tom (Ben Chandler), who discover a plot by the villain Mr Eldritch (Grant Parsons) to take over the world using school computers. Eldritch is eventually defeated by Marcie and the computer expert Professor Polzinsky (Rosalie Crutchley). The next three episodes focus on a new villain: the archaeologist Miss Pendragon (Jacqueline Pearce), later described by Davies as a "devil worshipping Nazi lesbian", who becomes a part of the ancient supercomputer Behemoth. The two distinct plot elements converge at the end of the fifth episode, when Pendragon crashes through the school stage as Eldritch walks into the auditorium.

Dark Season uses concepts seen in his tenure as executive producer of Doctor Who: "School Reunion", written by Toby Whithouse, shares its concept of the antagonist using computers in a comprehensive school to take over the world; "Army of Ghosts" unexpectedly brings together the series' two major villains for the final episode; and the characters of Marcie and her friends are similar, albeit unintentionally, to the structure of the Doctor and their companions. Dark Season was the first series he was credited as "Russell T Davies"—the initial arbitrarily chosen to distinguish himself from the BBC Radio 4 presenter—and the first series he was commissioned to write a novelisation: it features a more ambiguous climax and foreshadows a sequel set in an arcade similar to the one featured in The Sarah Jane Adventures serial, Warriors of Kudlak.

Davies started planning a second series for Dark Season, which followed a similar structure. The first half of the series would take part in the arcade mentioned in the novelisation, and the second would feature the appearance of psychic twins and the re-emergence of the villain Eldritch. The concepts were transferred to its spiritual successor, Century Falls, which was produced in 1993 at the request of Dark Season director Colin Cant. The series primarily used the "psychic twins" concept and was set in an isolated village based on those in the Yorkshire Dales and the North York Moors.

The plot of Century Falls is driven by a legend that no children had been born in the eponymous village for more than forty years. The protagonist, Tess Hunter (Catherine Sanderson), is an overweight teenager who moves to the village with her mother at the beginning of the serial. She quickly befriends the psychic Ben Naismith (Simon Fenton) and his twin sister Carey (Emma Jane Lavin). The three teenagers examine the waterfall that gave Ben his powers and the disaster which caused the legendary infertility. The serial climaxes in a confrontation between Tess and the deity Century, who is attempting to fuse with Tess's unborn sister.

Century Falls is conceptually much darker than its predecessor Dark Season and his later work, which Davies attributed to a trend that inexperienced writers "get off on the dark stuff": In a BAFTA interview with Davies, Home recalled she "very nearly got into trouble because it did actually push at the boundaries which some of the powers-that-be would rather not have been pushed". The series offered a sense of realism in its protagonist, who is not heroic and aspirational, has poor social skills, and is bluntly described by Ben as a "fat girl". Century Falls was the last script he wrote for CBBC for fourteen years. He had begun to formulate another successor: The Heat of the Sun, a series set over Christmas 1999 and New Year's Day 2000 that would have included the concepts of psychic powers and world domination.

Children's Ward
While he was writing Dark Season and Century Falls, Davies sought freelance projects elsewhere; these included three scripts for the BBC children's comedy ChuckleVision. One venture in 1991 led him to Granada Television, where he edited scripts for the ITV children's medical drama Children's Ward under the supervision of eventual Coronation Street producer Tony Wood and his former boss Ed Pugh. By 1992, he had been promoted to producer and oversaw an increase in discussion of larger contemporary issues. In 1993, he wrote a script about a teenage boy who had been infected with HIV via a blood transfusion, which challenged the prevalent assumption only gay people contracted HIV:

Davies left the role of producer in 1994, but continued to write occasionally for the series. Notably, he was requested to write the 100th episode of the series, by then called The Ward, which aired in October 1996. Instead of celebrating the milestone, he wrote a script about a recently emerging threat: paedophiles in online chat-rooms. The episode was about an X-Files fan who was drawn in by a paedophile's offer of a rare magazine. In the dénouement of the episode, the child recounts the tale of his near abduction and describes his attacker as "just a man like any other man". The episode earned Davies his first Children's BAFTA award for Best Drama.

Adult television career (1994–2004) 
During his production tenure on Children's Ward, Davies continued to seek other freelance writing jobs, particularly for soap operas; his intention was to eventually work on the popular and long-running Granada soap Coronation Street. In pursuit of this career plan, he storylined soaps such as Families and wrote scripts for shows such as Cluedo, a game show based on the board game of the same name, and Do the Right Thing, a localised version of the Brazilian panel show Você Decide with Terry Wogan as presenter and Frank Skinner as a regular panellist. One writing job, for The House of Windsor, a soap opera about footmen in Buckingham Palace, was so poorly received his other scripts for the show would be written under the pseudonym Leo Vaughn.

In 1994, Davies relinquished all of his producing jobs, and was offered a scriptwriting role on the late-night soap opera Revelations, created by him, Tony Wood, and Brian B. Thompson. The series was a tongue-in-cheek deconstruction of organised religion, and featured his first overtly homosexual character: a lesbian vicar portrayed by Sue Holderness, who came out of the closet in a two-hander episode with Carole Nimmons.

Davies attributes the revelation about Holderness's character as a consequence of both the "pressure cooker nature" of the show and the recent ordination of female vicars in the Church of England. He let his contract with Granada expire and pitched a new early-evening soap opera to Channel 4, RU, with its creator Bill Moffat, Sandra Hastie, a producer on Moffat's previous series Press Gang, and co-writer Paul Cornell. Although the slot was eventually taken by Hollyoaks, he and Cornell mutually benefited from the pitch: Davies introduced Cornell to the Children's Ward producers and established contact with Moffat's son Steven, and Cornell introduced Davies to Virgin Publishing. Davies wrote one Doctor Who Virgin New Adventures novel, Damaged Goods, in which the Doctor tracks a Class A drug tainted by Time Lord technology across several galaxies. The book includes several themes which Davies would intersperse in his later works—including a family called "Tyler" and companion Chris Cwej participating in casual homosexual sex— and a subplot formed the inspiration for The Mother War, a proposed but never produced thriller for Granada about a woman, Eva Jericho, and a calcified foetus in her uterus.

Davies continued to propose dramas to Channel 4. The next drama to be commissioned was Springhill, an apocalyptic soap-opera, co-created by Frank Cottrell Boyce and Paul Abbott, which aired simultaneously on Sky One and Channel 4 in 1996–97. Set in suburban Liverpool, the series focuses on the devoutly Catholic Freeman family and their encounter and conflict with Eva Morrigan (Katharine Rogers). He storylined for the second series, but submitted fewer scripts; Granada had commissioned him to write for their soap The Grand, temporarily storyline for Coronation Street, and write the straight-to-video special, Coronation Street: Viva Las Vegas!. The second series of Springhill continued his penchant for symbolism; in particular, it depicted Marion Freeman (Judy Holt) and Eva as personifications of good and evil, and climaxed with a finale set in an ultra-liberal dystopian future where premarital sex and homosexuality are embraced by the Church. Boyce later commented that without Davies' input, the show would have been a "dry run" for Abbott's hit show Shameless.

The Grand

Davies' next project was The Grand, a period soap drama set in a Manchester hotel during the interwar period. It was designed to be a valuable show in a ratings war with the BBC and was scheduled at 9 pm on a Friday night. After the original writer abandoned the series, Granada approached him to write the entire show. His scripts for the first series reflect the pessimism of the period; each episode added its own emotional trauma on the staff; these included a soldier's execution for desertion, a destitute maid who threatened to illegally abort her unborn child to survive, and a multi-episode about the chambermaid, Monica Jones (Jane Danson), who kills her rapist in self-defence, is arrested, and eventually hanged for murder. The show was renewed for a second series despite the first's dark tone.

The second series had a lighter tone and greater emphasis on character development, which Davies attributed to his friend Sally, who had previously warned him of the adult humour in Breakfast Serials; she told him his show was too bleak to be compared to real life. He highlighted the sixth and eighth episodes of the second series as a time of maturity as a writer: for the sixth, he utilised then-unconventional narrative devices such as flashbacks to explore the hotel barman's closeted homosexuality and the societal attitudes towards sexuality in the 1920s; and he highlighted the eighth as when he allowed the series to "take on its own life" by deliberately inserting plot devices such as McGuffins to enhance the comic relief of the series.

Although well received, the series' ratings were not high enough to warrant a third series. After its cancellation in September 1997, Davies had an existential crisis after almost dying from an accidental overdose; the experience persuaded him to detoxify and make a name for himself by producing a series which celebrated his homosexuality.

Queer as Folk

After his near-death experience, Davies started to develop a series for Channel 4 which reflected the "hedonistic lifestyle" of the gay quarter of Manchester he was leaving behind. Encouraged by ex-Granada executives Catriona MacKenzie and Gub Neil to "go gay", the series focused on a group of friends in Manchester's gay scene, tentatively titled The Other End of the Ballroom, and later, Queer as Fuck.

By February 1998, when he completed the first draft for the series première, the series was known under its eventual title Queer as Folk. The series emulates dramas such as Band of Gold in presenting realistic discussion on sexuality, as opposed to "one-sided" gay characters in soap operas such as EastEnders, and eschews "heavy-handed discussion" of issues such as HIV; the show instead focuses on the party scene on Canal Street.

After he wrote the pilot, he approached actors for the main characters. Christopher Eccleston was Davies' first choice for the role of Stuart Jones; Eccleston declined because of his age and suggested his friend Aidan Gillen instead. The roles of Vince Tyler and Nathan Maloney were given to Craig Kelly and Charlie Hunnam, and the secondary character Alexander Perry, originally written for the television producer Phil Collinson during his brief acting career, was portrayed by Antony Cotton, who later played the gay character Sean Tully in Coronation Street. The series was allocated a £3 million budget, and was produced by Red Productions, owned by his friend and former colleague Nicola Shindler, and filmed by director Charles McDougall and Sarah Hardin on location in Manchester. The eight 40-minute episodes emulated experiences from his social life and includes an episode where the minor character Phil Delaney (Jason Merrells) dies of a cocaine overdose, unnoticed by his social circle.

The series was aired in early 1999, when Parliament were discussing LGBT equality; the series première aired on the day the House of Lords was discussing the Sexual Offences Bill 1999, which eventually reduced the age of consent for homosexual couples to 16. The première was controversial, in particular because it depicted the character Nathan, aged 15, in sexual intercourse with an older man; the broadcasting watchdog Ofcom received 136 complaints and the series received criticism from Hunnam's parents and from activist Mary Whitehouse. The controversy was amplified when the sponsor Beck's withdrew after several episodes and homosexual activists complained the series was not representative of gay culture. Nevertheless, the show garnered 3.5 million viewers per episode and a generally positive reaction from fans, and was renewed for a two-episode special due for the following year.

Queer as Folk 2 was broadcast in 2000 and was driven by the plot element of Vince's half-sister's wedding. The specials place emphasis on Vince and Stuart's relationship, and ends with their departure for another gay scene in a pastiche of Grease, as Nathan took the role as the leader of the Manchester scene's next generation. The show ended on 22 February 2000. On the heels of the special, Davies pitched the spin-off Misfits, a late-night soap opera set in a boarding house owned by Vince's mother, Hazel, and The Second Coming, a series which depicted the Second Coming of Christ in contemporary Manchester. Misfits was rejected in December 2000 and The Second Coming was initially approved by Channel 4 but later rejected after a change of executive personnel. Instead of contesting the cancellation of The Second Coming, he left Channel 4 and vowed to not work with them again.

Bob & Rose

Shindler continued to pitch The Second Coming to other television networks while Davies sought other ventures. His next series was based on a gay friend who married a woman and fathered a child. He saw the relationship as a promising concept for an unconventional love story and asked the couple about their relationship to develop the show. After he developed the series around the prejudice he and his gay friends had shown, he realised he was creating caricatures for the purpose of exposing them, and instead focused on telling a traditional love story and gave the couple the traditionally British names of Bob Gossage and Rose Cooper.

To simulate a classic love story, the plot required antagonists, in the form of Bob's best friend and fellow teacher Holly Vance and Rose's boyfriend Andy Lewis (Daniel Ryan). While Andy, named after Davies' boyfriend Andrew Smith, was a minor character and departed in the third episode, Holly featured throughout the entirety of the series. Bob & Rose thus followed a similar format to Queer as Folk, in particular, the triumvirate of main characters composed of a couple and an outsider who lived in contemporary Manchester, and inverted the traditional "coming out" story by focusing on Bob's uncharacteristic attraction to Rose; Bob describes his sexual life by simply speaking the line "I fancy men. And her." The series was similar to the Kevin Smith film Chasing Amy (1997), as they both portrayed a romance between a straight character and gay character and the resulting ostracism from the couple's social circles, much like The Second Coming shared its concept with Smith's 1999 film Dogma.

Like Queer as Folk, Bob & Rose contributed to the contemporary political debate around LGBT rights: a subplot involves the fictional pressure group Parents Against Homphobia (PAH), led by Bob's mother Monica (Penelope Wilton), an ardent gay rights activist, and their campaign to repeal Section 28 of the Local Government Act 1988, which prohibited local authorities from "intentionally promot[ing]" homosexuality. The subplot climaxes in the fourth episode, when Monica and Bob lead a rally into direct action by handcuffing themselves to a bus run by a company whose management donated millions to keeping the law on the books; the scene directly parallels protests against the transport company Stagecoach due to their founder Brian Souter's financial and political support of Section 28—at one point, Davies intended to explicitly name Stagecoach in the script— and is inspired by earlier protests undertaken by the LGBT rights pressure group OutRage!.

After successfully pitching the show to ITV, Red Productions joined Davies in casting the show and initially approached Jonathan Creek star Alan Davies to portray Bob. Although he was not gay, Davies accepted the role and spent several weeks researching first-hand Manchester's gay scene with series director Joe Wright. His only objection to the role was Bob being a fan of Manchester United F.C., the team Shindler had named Red Productions for, because of his prolific support of Arsenal F.C. The part of Rose was given to Lesley Sharp, her first leading role after her portrayal of secondary characters in past Red shows Playing the Field and Clocking Off, and Jessica Stevenson was cast as Holly by ITV Head of Drama Nick Elliott on the basis of her performance in the Channel 4 comedy Spaced.

The series was filmed in the southern suburbs of Manchester between March and June 2001 and often used Davies' own home as a green room. The series was the only Red–Davies collaboration not to be scored by future Doctor Who composer Murray Gold; the soundtrack was a Martin Phipps composition inspired by Hans Zimmer's work on the 1993 film True Romance. It aired on Monday nights in September and October 2001. Critically acclaimed, the series won two British Comedy Awards, and received a nomination at the British Academy Television Awards. However, the series had lower viewership than expected and was moved to a later timeslot for the final two episodes. Although the series was not as successful as he hoped, the show helped Davies rekindle his relationship with his mother shortly before her death, just after the transmission of the fourth episode, which he sees as "possibly the best thing [he has] ever written".

The Second Coming

Shortly after the transmission of Bob & Rose, Davies was approached by Abbott to write for his new BBC show Linda Green. He accepted the offer and wrote an episode where the titular character (Liza Tarbuck) and her friends attend a schoolmate's funeral and become psychologically haunted by the deceased woman's solitary life. His first work for the BBC in eight years prompted them to approach him with additional concepts for period dramas, which he invariably declined as his sole intent was to revive Doctor Who, which had then been on hiatus for over a decade.

In 2002, he met with the BBC to discuss the revival of the show and producing The Second Coming; the BBC were unable to commit to either, and he again declined to work for them. After the BBC rejected The Second Coming, Shindler proposed the series should be pitched to ITV. Despite the story's controversial message, the critical success of Bob & Rose encouraged the channel to commission the series for broadcast.

The Second Coming had been several years in the making and endured many rewrites from the first draft presented to Channel 4 in 2000, but retained its key concept of a depiction of the Second Coming of Christ with a humanity-centred deity. A major removal from the script, due to time constraints, was a long sequence titled "Night of the Demons": the main character, a shop assistant, Stephen Baxter, who discovers his divine lineage, takes over a hotel with his disciples and eventually encounters several of the hotel's employees which had been possessed by the Devil. Several similar sequences were removed to create a thriller set in the days before Judgement Day.

An experienced actor was required to portray Stephen; Davies approached Christopher Eccleston, who had previously been approached for the role of Stuart in Queer as Folk, based on his performance as Nicky Hutchinson in the drama Our Friends in the North. Eccleston accepted the role and helped Davies make the character more human after he observed "Baxter was getting lost amid his loftier pronouncements". The character of Judith, who would represent the fall of God, was given to Lesley Sharp after her performance in Bob & Rose, and the role of the Devil was given to Mark Benton.

The Second Coming was controversial from its conception. When it was a Channel 4 project, it was the subject of a Sunday Express article a year before its original projected transmission date of late 2001. The series would again receive criticism when it was rumoured it would be broadcast over the Easter weekend of 2003. The series was eventually broadcast over consecutive nights on 9–10 February 2003 to 6.3 million and 5.4 million viewers, respectively, and received mixed reactions from the audience: Davies reportedly received death threats for its atheistic message and criticism for its anticlimactic ending, as well as two nominations for Television Awards and one for a Royal Television Society Award.

Mine All Mine

In the time near his mother's death, Davies returned to Swansea several times and reflected on the role of family. During one visit, he realised he had not yet written a series set in Wales; hence, he created a series about a family who discovers they own the entire city of Swansea. The series was a departure from his trend of experimental social commentary; it was instead designed to be a mainstream comedy which utilised Welsh actors: Davies and Red Productions even planned a cameo appearance by Academy Award-winning Swansea-born Catherine Zeta-Jones.

Because the series was centred on an entire family, Red Productions was given the task of casting eleven principal characters: the role of family patriarch Max Vivaldi was given to Griff Rhys Jones, at the request of ITV for prolific actors; Rhian Morgan, Davies' ex-girlfriend from the WGYT, was cast as Max's wife Val; Sharon Morgan as Max's sister Stella; Joanna Page as Candy Vivaldi; Matthew Barry and Siwan Morris as the Vivaldi siblings Leo and Maria; Hi-de-Hi! actress Ruth Madoc as Val's sister Myrtle Jones; and Jason Hughes as Maria's boyfriend Gethin. The series, specifically the family's composition of two daughters and a gay son, mirrored his own upbringing to the point where Davies and his boyfriend referred to the show as "The Private Joke".

The series was originally written in six parts, but Davies excised a large portion of the fifth episode because the crew expressed concerns with its pacing. The series was filmed in late 2003 under the direction of Sheree Folkson and Tim Whitby, and utilised many areas of Swansea which Davies was familiar with since his childhood. It aired as four-hour-long episodes and a ninety-minute finale on Thursday nights preceding Christmas 2003. Eventually, Mine All Mine would be his least successful series and ended its run with just over two million viewers, which he later blamed on the series' high eccentricity.

Casanova

Shortly after the transmission of Mine All Mine, the BBC commissioned Davies to produce the revival of Doctor Who, which completed his decade-long quest to return the series to the airwaves. At the time, he was developing two scripts: the first, a cinematic adaptation of the Charles Ingram Who Wants to Be a Millionaire? scandal, was cancelled after he accepted the Doctor Who job; and the second, a dramatisation of the life of the Venetian adventurer and lover Giacomo Casanova, was his next show with Red Productions.

Davies' association with Casanova began when London Weekend Television producers Julie Gardner, Michele Buck, and Damien Timmer approached him to write a 21st-century adaptation of Casanova's memoirs. He accepted to script the series because it was "the best subject in the world" and, after reading the memoirs, sought to create a realistic depiction of Casanova instead of further perpetuating the stereotype of a hypersexual lover. The series was originally written for ITV, but was turned down after he could not agree on the length of the serial. Shortly after ITV declined to produce Casanova, Gardner took up a position as Head of Drama at BBC Wales and brought the concept with her. The BBC agreed to fund the series, but could only release the money required if a regionally based independent company produced the series. Davies turned to Shindler, who agreed to become the serial's fifth executive producer.

Davies' script takes place in two distinct time frames and required two different actors for the eponymous role: the older Casanova was portrayed by Peter O'Toole, and the younger Casanova was portrayed by David Tennant. The serial takes place primarily during Casanova's early adulthood and depicts his life among three women: his mother (Dervla Kirwan), his lover Henriette (Laura Fraser), and his consort Bellino (Nina Sosanya). The script takes a different approach to Dennis Potter's 1971 dramatisation; instead of Potter's focus on sex and misogyny, the 2005 serial focuses on Casanova's compassion and respect for women.

Casanova was filmed alongside the first few episodes of the new series of Doctor Who, which meant producers common to both projects, including Davies and Gardner, made daily journeys between the former's production in Lancashire and Cheshire and the latter's production in Cardiff. Red Productions also filmed on location overseas in a stately home in Dubrovnik, and alongside production of the identically titled 2005 Lasse Hallström film in Venice. The two production teams shared resources and were given the unofficial names of "Little Casanova" and "Big Casanova" respectively. When it premièred on BBC Three in March 2005, the first episode attracted 940,000 viewers, a record for a first-run drama on the channel, but was overshadowed on BBC One by the return of Doctor Who in the same month.

Doctor Who (2005–2010) 

Since watching First Doctor's (William Hartnell) regeneration into the Second Doctor (Patrick Troughton) at the end of the 1966 serial The Tenth Planet, Davies had "fallen in love" with the show and, by the mid-1970s, he was regularly writing reviews of broadcast serials in his diary. His favourite writer and childhood hero was Robert Holmes; during his career, he has complimented the creative use of BBC studios to create "terror and claustrophobia" for Holmes's 1975 script The Ark in Space—his favourite serial from the original series—and has opined that the first episode of The Talons of Weng-Chiang (1977) featured "the best dialogue ever written; it's up there with Dennis Potter". His screenwriting career also began with a Doctor Who submission; in 1987, he submitted a spec script set on an intergalactic news aggregator and broadcaster, which was rejected by script editor Andrew Cartmel, who suggested that he should write a more prosaic story about "a man who is worried about his mortgage, his marriage, [and] his dog". The script was eventually retooled and transmitted as "The Long Game" in 2005.

During the late 1990s, Davies lobbied the BBC to revive the show from its hiatus and reached the discussion stages in late 1998 and early 2002. His proposals would update the show to be better suited for a 21st-century audience: the series would be recorded on film instead of videotape; the length of each episode would double from twenty-five minutes to fifty; episodes would primarily take place on Earth, in the style of the Third Doctor (Jon Pertwee) UNIT episodes; and Davies would remove "excess baggage" from the mythology such as Gallifrey and the Time Lords. Davies' pitch competed against Dan Freedman's proposed retool as a fantasy series, Matthew Graham's gothic horror-styled reboot, and the Mark Gatiss—Gareth Roberts—Clayton Hickman pitch which made the Doctor the audience surrogate character, instead of his companions. Davies also took cues from American fantasy television series such as Buffy the Vampire Slayer and Smallville, most notably Buffys concepts of series-long story arcs and the "Big Bad".

In August 2003, the BBC had resolved the legal confusion over production rights which had surfaced as a result of the jointly produced Universal Studios–BBC–20th Century Fox 1996 Doctor Who film, and the Controller of BBC One Lorraine Heggessey and Controller of Drama Commissioning Jane Tranter approached Gardner and Davies to create a revival of the series to air in a primetime slot on Saturday nights, as part of their plan to devolve production to its regional bases. By mid-September, they accepted the deal to produce the series alongside Casanova.

Davies' pitch for Doctor Who was the first one he wrote voluntarily; previously, he opted to outline concepts of shows to commissioning executives and offer to write the pilot episode because he felt a pitch made him "feel like [he's] killing the work". The fifteen-page pitch outlined a Doctor who was "your best friend; someone you want to be with all the time", the 19-year-old Rose Tyler (Billie Piper) as a "perfect match" for the new Doctor, avoidance of the 40-year back story "except for the good bits", the retention of the TARDIS, sonic screwdriver, and Daleks, removal of the Time Lords, and a greater focus on humanity. His pitch was submitted for the first production meeting in December 2003 and a series of thirteen episodes was obtained by pressure from BBC Worldwide and a workable budget from Julie Gardner.

The first new series of Doctor Who featured eight scripts by Davies; the remainder were allocated to experienced dramatists and writers for the show's ancillary releases: Steven Moffat penned a two-episode story, and Mark Gatiss, Robert Shearman, and Paul Cornell each wrote one script. Davies also approached his old friend Paul Abbott and Harry Potter author J. K. Rowling to write for the series; both declined due to existing commitments. Shortly after he secured writers for the show, Davies stated he had no intention of approaching writers from the old series; the only writer he would have wished to work with was Holmes, who died in May 1986.

By early 2004, the show had settled into a regular production cycle. Davies, Gardner, and BBC Controller of Continuing Drama Series Mal Young took posts as executive producers, and Phil Collinson, his old colleague from Granada, took the role of producer. Davies' official position as showrunner combined the roles of head writer and executive producer and consisted of laying a skeletal plot for the entire series, holding "tone meetings" to correctly identify the tone of an episode, often described in one word—for example, the "tone word" for Moffat's "The Empty Child" was "romantic"—and overseeing all aspects of production.

The production team was also tasked with finding a suitable actor for the role of the Doctor. Most notably, they approached film actor Hugh Grant and comedian Rowan Atkinson for the role. By the time Young suggested The Second Coming and Our Friends in the North actor Christopher Eccleston to Davies, Eccleston was one of three left in the running for the role: the other candidates are rumoured to have been Alan Davies and Bill Nighy. Eccleston created his own characteristics of his rendition of the Doctor based on Davies' life, most notably, his catchphrase "Fantastic!":

The show started filming in July 2004 on location in Cardiff for "Rose". The start of filming created stress among the production team because of unseen circumstances: several scenes from the first block had to be re-shot because the original footage was unusable; the Slitheen prosthetics for "Aliens of London", "World War Three", and "Boom Town" were noticeably different from their computer-generated counterparts; and the BBC came to a gridlock in negotiations with the Terry Nation estate to secure the Daleks for the sixth episode of the series; Davies and episode writer Rob Shearman were forced to rework the script to feature another race, until Gardner was able to secure the rights a month later. After the first production block, which he described as "hitting a brick wall", the show's production was markedly eased as the crew familiarised themselves.

The first episode of the revived Doctor Who, "Rose", aired on 26 March 2005 and received 10.8 million viewers and favourable critical reception. Four days after the transmission of "Rose", Tranter approved a Christmas special and a second series. The press release was overshadowed by a leaked announcement that Christopher Eccleston would leave the role after one series; in response, David Tennant was announced as Eccleston's replacement.

Tennant had been offered the role when he was watching a pre-transmission copy of Doctor Who with Davies and Gardner. Tennant initially believed the offer was a joke, but after he realised they were serious, he accepted the role and made his first appearance in the dénouement of "The Parting of the Ways", the final episode of the first series. Doctor Who continued to be one of BBC's flagship programmes throughout Davies' tenure, and resulted in record sales of the show's official magazine, an increase in spin-off novels, and the launch of the children's magazine Doctor Who Adventures and toy sonic screwdrivers and Daleks. The show's popularity ultimately led to a resurgence in family-orientated Saturday night drama; the ITV science-fiction series Primeval and the BBC historical dramas Robin Hood and Merlin were specifically designed for an early Saturday evening timeslot. Davies was also approached by the BBC to produce several spin-off series, eventually creating two: Torchwood and The Sarah Jane Adventures.

Torchwood and The Sarah Jane Adventures

In October 2005, BBC Three Controller Stuart Murphy invited Davies to create a post-watershed Doctor Who spin-off in the wake of the parent series' popularity. Torchwood—named after an anagrammatic title ruse used to prevent leaks of Doctor Who's first series—incorporated elements from an abandoned Davies project titled Excalibur and featured the pansexual 51st century time-traveler Jack Harkness (John Barrowman) and a team of alien hunters in Cardiff. The show began production in April 2006 and was marketed through foreshadowing in the main story arc of Doctor Who's second series, which portrayed Torchwood as a covert quasi-governmental organisation that monitors, exploits, and suppresses the existence of extraterrestrial life and technology. Upon its transmission, Torchwood was one of BBC Three's most popular shows; however, it received criticism for "adolescent" use of sexual and violent themes. This led the production team to alter the format to be subtler in its portrayal of adult themes.

Concurrently, he was approached to produce a CBBC show which was described as Young Doctor Who. Davies was reluctant to diminish the mystery of the Doctor's character and instead pitched a show with Elisabeth Sladen as the once-popular companion Sarah Jane Smith: The Sarah Jane Adventures, which follows Sarah Jane and local schoolchildren as they investigate extraterrestrial events in the London Borough of Ealing. The show was given a backdoor pilot as the Doctor Who episode "School Reunion" and premièred in its own right with "Invasion of the Bane" on 1 January 2007. The show was more successful than its 1981 predecessor K-9 and Company; it received more favourable reviews than Torchwood and a significant periphery demographic which compared the show to 1970s Doctor Who episodes.

The workload of managing three separate shows prompted Davies to delegate writing tasks for Torchwood and The Sarah Jane Adventures to other writers so he could focus on writing Doctor Who. After Billie Piper's departure as Rose Tyler in the second series finale "Doomsday", he suggested a third spin-off, Rose Tyler: Earth Defence, a compilation of annual bank holiday specials which followed Rose and a parallel universe version of Torchwood. He later reneged on his idea, as he believed Rose should stay off screen, and abandoned the idea even though it had been budgeted.

The Writer's Tale, and writing the fourth series

In September 2008, BBC Books published The Writer's Tale, a collection of emails between Davies and Radio Times and Doctor Who Magazine journalist Benjamin Cook. Dubbed the "Great Correspondence" by Davies and Cook, The Writer's Tale covers a period between February 2007 and March 2008 and explores his writing processes and the development of his scripts for the fourth series of Doctor Who: "Voyage of the Damned", "Partners in Crime", "Midnight", "Turn Left", "The Stolen Earth", and "Journey's End". The book's first chapter focuses on Cook's "big questions" on Davies' writing style, character development—he used the Doctor Who character Donna Noble (Catherine Tate) and the Skins character Tony Stonem (Nicholas Hoult) as contrasting examples—, how he formulated ideas for stories, and the question "why do you write?". After several weeks, Cook assumes an unofficial advisory role to the scriptwriting and the development of the series. The book's epilogue consists of a short exchange between Davies and Cook: Cook changes from his role as "Invisible Ben" to "Visible Ben" and strongly advises to vastly alter the denouement to "Journey's End" from a cliffhanger which led into "The Next Doctor"—which had occurred in the previous three series finales, "The Parting of the Ways", "Doomsday", and "Last of the Time Lords"—to a melancholy ending that showed the Doctor alone in the TARDIS. After three days of deliberation, Davies accepts Cook's suggestion and thanks him for improving both episodes.

After its release, the pair embarked on a five-stop signing tour to promote the book in October 2008 at Waterstone's branches in London, Birmingham, Manchester, Bristol, and Cardiff. The book received positive reviews: Veronica Horwell of The Guardian wrote Davies was the "Scheherazade of Cardiff Bay" and opined the book should have been twice the published length; Ian Berriman of science fiction magazine SFX gave the book five stars and commented it was the only book about "new Who" a reader needed; television critic Charlie Brooker was inspired by the book to devote an entire episode of his BBC Four show Screenwipe to interviewing television writers; and chat show couple Richard and Judy selected the book as a recommended Christmas present in the "Serious Non-Fiction" category of their book club. A second edition of the book, The Writer's Tale: The Final Chapter, was released in January 2010 by BBC Books. The second edition added 350 pages of correspondence—before excising draft scripts included in the first edition—and covered Davies' final months as executive producer of Doctor Who as he co-wrote the five-part BBC One Torchwood miniseries Children of Earth, planned David Tennant's departure and Matt Smith's arrival as the Doctor, and moved to the United States.

Post–Doctor Who career (2010–present) 
Davies stepped down from the show's production in 2009 along with Gardner and Collinson, and finished his tenure with four special length episodes. His departure from the show was announced in May 2008, alongside a press release which named Steven Moffat as his successor. His role in late 2008 was split between writing the 2009 specials and preparing for the transition between his and Moffat's production team; one chapter of The Writer's Tale: The Final Chapter discusses plans between him, Gardner, and Tennant to announce Tennant's departure live during ITV's National Television Awards in October 2008. His final full script for Doctor Who was finished in the early morning of 4 March 2009, and filming of the episode closed on 20 May 2009.

Davies moved with Gardner and Jane Tranter to the United States in June 2009 and resided in Los Angeles, California. He continued to oversee production of Torchwood and The Sarah Jane Adventures; he wrote one story for the 2010 series of The Sarah Jane Adventures, Death of the Doctor, which included Matt Smith as the Doctor and Katy Manning as the Doctor's former companion Jo Grant, and was the executive producer and author of the premiere ("The New World") and finale ("The Blood Line") of Torchwood: Miracle Day, the fourth series of Torchwood. He additionally gave informal assistance to and later served as creative consultant of ex-Doctor Who script editor Helen Raynor's and playwright Gary Owen's BBC Cymru Wales drama, Baker Boys. Davies had planned to return to art by writing a graphic novel, and was approached by Lucasfilm to write for the proposed Star Wars live-action television series but refused the commission.

In August 2011, Davies' boyfriend Andrew Smith was diagnosed with a brain tumour, which prompted Davies to postpone current projects and move back to the UK so his partner could undergo treatment closer to their respective families. Davies' return enabled him to develop a replacement series for The Sarah Jane Adventures with prolific series writer Phil Ford after the former series ended due to Elisabeth Sladen's death. Wizards vs Aliens, a CBBC drama about a teenage wizard and his scientist friend and their conflict with the alien Nekross who wished to destroy Earth, was formed to create a "genre clash" between science fiction and supernatural fantasy, as opposed to "culture clashes" such as Cowboys vs. Aliens. Davies additionally made his first contribution to CBeebies, with two scripts for Old Jack's Boat, which stars Doctor Who alumni Bernard Cribbins and Freema Agyeman as retired fisherman Jack and his neighbour Shelley.

Cucumber, Banana, and Tofu
Davies' next project after Doctor Who, codenamed More Gay Men, was a spiritual successor to Queer as Folk and would have focused on middle-aged gay men in the Manchester gay scene. The show's genesis dates back from 2001, when his friend Carl Austin asked him "why are gay men so glad when we split up?". The show was due to enter into production in 2006, but was indefinitely postponed due to the success of Doctor Who. Davies continued to develop ideas for the show, and explained a pivotal scene in the premiere to Cook in 2007:

In 2011, the series had entered into pre-production, with American cable network Showtime contracted for transmission and BBC Worldwide for distribution. Showtime had reached the point of casting before Davies moved back to Manchester, at which point the series was picked up by Channel 4 to be produced with Nicola Shindler and the Red Production Company. The commission by Channel 4 marked Davies' first collaboration with the channel since Queer as Folk and Shindler and Red since Casanova. Davies was convinced to return to the channel by Head of Drama and former Doctor Who executive producer Piers Wenger, who described the show as a "political piece of writing" which creates a "radical approach" to sexuality.

Cucumber focuses on the life of the middle-aged Henry Best (Vincent Franklin) and the fallout from a disastrous date with his boyfriend of nine years, and is accompanied with Banana, an E4 anthology series about younger characters across the LGBT spectrum on the periphery of the Cucumber narrative, and Tofu, an online documentary series available on All 4 which discusses modern sex, sexuality and issues arisen during the show with the cast and public. The three names reference a urological scale which categorises the male erection by hardness from tofu to cucumber, and are used to symbolise differences in sexual attitudes and behaviour between the two generations. Although Cucumber was designed as a self-contained serial about the life of one man, Davies envisioned Banana as open-ended with the potential to continue after its sister series finished.

Second return to the BBC
After Cucumber, Davies returned to the BBC in 2016 to produce A Midsummer Night's Dream, an adaptation of William Shakespeare's play of the same name. Davies credits the play as "opening his eyes to drama" after he starred in a school version of the play as Bottom.

In 2018, Davies produced and wrote the screenplay for A Very English Scandal, an adaptation of the book of the same name about the Thorpe affair—a sex scandal which involved former Liberal Party leader Jeremy Thorpe—which starred Hugh Grant as Thorpe and Ben Whishaw as Thorpe's former lover Norman Scott. Davies' screenplay is more compassionate to Thorpe and Scott than previous narratives of the scandal, which he described as "history written by straight men". For his writing on the series, Davies received a nomination for the Primetime Emmy Award for Outstanding Writing for a Limited Series, Movie, or Dramatic Special in 2019.

Davies followed that with the miniseries Years and Years, a Red Production Company series for BBC One which starred Emma Thompson, Rory Kinnear and Russell Tovey. It focuses on an ordinary family in Manchester who experience massive political, economic, and technological changes over fifteen years as a fascist dictator, played by Thompson, takes over Britain.

It's a Sin 
It's a Sin, began filming on 7 October 2019—under the working title of Boys—and completed filming on 31 January 2020. The series, produced by Red Productions for Channel 4, is a dramatised retrospective of the HIV/AIDS crisis during the 1980s, focusing on the men "living in the bedsits", as opposed to films such as Pride, which focused on gay activists. Davies notes the stories about the politics of the crisis and the virus itself has been told, but not those about the early victims of the virus itself.

In 2015, Davies described Boys as a way of "coming to terms" with his own actions during the 1980s, when the shock of the crisis prevented him from properly mourning the deaths of his close friends. Elements of It's a Sin mirror Davies' own experiences during the 1980s: a scene in the second episode where protagonist Richie Tozer—played by Years & Years frontman Olly Alexander—mocks AIDS reflects denialist attitudes in the gay community during the early years of the crisis; the show's characters live in a fictionalised version of the "Pink Palace" flatshare-cum-party house owned by Davies' friends; and Lydia West plays a fictionalised version of Davies' childhood friend—and later actress—Jill Nalder, who appears in the show as the fictional Jill's mother.

It's a Sin is Davies' first script to primarily focus on AIDS since Children's Ward, although the pandemic's legacy is present in his other shows: Queer as Folk relegates AIDS to fleeting mentions as Davies "refused to let [gay peoples'] lives be defined by the disease"; and in Cucumber, middle-aged protagonist Henry blames "those fucking icebergs" for his fear of intimacy. Although the series was filmed prior to the COVID-19 pandemic, the show's transmission in early 2021 invited comparisons between the two pandemics; Davies himself cited the "overreaction and lack of reaction" to the pandemics, as well as the focus on social distancing and personal protective equipment, as "history [repeating] itself", and Alexander likened his character's AIDS denialism in the opening episode to COVID-19 conspiracy theorists.

Future projects
Davies' next project is Nolly, a biopic starring Helena Bonham Carter as British soap opera star Noele Gordon. Filming took place in mid-2022, and is set to air on ITV in 2023. Davies has also plans to write a series about sextortion, drawing inspiration from real-life incidents of blackmail which resulted in suicide, and to adapt Charles Dickens' The Old Curiosity Shop for television. He is also attached to an ITV project, Three Little Birds, a fictionalisation of Lenny Henry's mother's experiences arriving in Britain as part of the Windrush generation, as a script consultant and executive producer.

Return to Doctor Who 
After his departure from Doctor Who, Davies kept in contact with the show's crew and made several contributions to its expanded universe: in 2013, Davies made a cameo appearance in Peter Davison's spoof special The Five(ish) Doctors Reboot; in 2015, his Virgin New Adventures novel Damaged Goods was adapted into an audio play by Big Finish; in 2017 he illustrated a book of Doctor Who poetry titled Now We Are Six Hundred: A Collection of Time Lord Verse; and in 2018, he wrote a novelisation of "Rose" for Target Books.

During the COVID-19 lockdowns in 2020, Davies engaged with Doctor Who fans on social media by writing short stories and drawing sketches. For the "Rose" watch party, Davies released a short story originally written in 2013 for the show's fiftieth anniversary—the story was written for Doctor Who Magazine and stylised as the final pages of a Target novelisation, but was not included in the magazine due to continuity conflicts with the anniversary special "The Day of the Doctor"; for the "New Earth" and "Gridlock" watch party, he wrote the script for an animated sequel, "The Secret of Novice Hame", with Tennant and Anna Hope reprising their roles as the Doctor and Hame respectively; and for "The Runaway Bride" watch party, Davies shared excerpts of his 1986 spec script, Mind of the Hodiac, which was later optioned by Big Finish for its The Lost Stories audio play range, which was released on 30 March 2022.

On 24 September 2021, the BBC announced Davies would return as Doctor Who showrunner, succeeding Chris Chibnall for the show's 60th anniversary in 2023 and beyond. Davies is joined by the Bad Wolf production company, which was founded by Gardner and Tranter. In May 2022, the BBC announced that Davies had cast Rwandan–Scottish actor Ncuti Gatwa in the role of the Doctor; Gatwa will be the first black actor to portray the series' lead role. A week later, the BBC further announced that David Tennant and Catherine Tate would reprise their roles of the Doctor and Donna Noble in the show's 2023 specials, and that transgender actress Yasmin Finney would appear as a character named Rose. In November 2022, it was announced that Millie Gibson will join the cast as Ruby Sunday, the companion of Gatwa's Fifteenth Doctor.

Writing style
Davies is a self-admitted procrastinator and often waits hours or days for concepts to form before he commits them to the script. In The Writer's Tale, he describes his procrastination by discussing his early career: at the time, his method of dealing with the pressures of delivering a script was to "go out drinking" instead. On one occasion in the mid-1990s, he was at the Manchester gay club Cruz 101 when he thought of the climax to the first series of The Grand. As his career progressed, he instead spent entire nights "just thinking of plot, character, pace, etc" and waited until 2:00 am, "when the clubs used to shut", to overcome the urge of procrastination. Davies described the sense of anxiety he experiences in an email to Cook in April 2007, in response to Cook's question of "how do you know when to start writing?":

He expanded on his email two weeks later in response to Cook's query about the supposed link between major depressive disorder and creativity. He explained his anxiety and melancholy during the scriptwriting period still allowed him to keep on top of his work; on the other hand, he thought "Depression with a capital D [didn't provide] any such luxury".

Davies explained in length his writing process to Cook in The Writer's Tale. When he creates characters, he initially assigns a character a name and fits attributes around it. In the case of Rose Tyler (Billie Piper) in his inaugural series of Doctor Who, he chose the name because he considered it a "good luck charm" after he used it for Lesley Sharp's character in Bob & Rose. He presented his desire to make the show "essentially British" as another justification: he considered Rose to be "the most British name in the world" and feminine enough to subvert the then-current trend of female companions and their "boyish" names, such as Benny, Charley, and Ace. While he was writing for The Grand, the executive producer requested that he change the female lead character's name, a decision that led to the "character never [feeling] right from that moment on". The surname "Harkness", most notably given to Torchwood lead Captain Jack Harkness, is a similar charm, first used in 1993 for the Harkness family in Century Falls, and ultimately derived from the Marvel Universe supporting character Agatha Harkness, and the surname "Tyler" is similarly used because of his affection for how the surname is spelled and pronounced.

Davies also attempts to channel his writing by using music that fits the theme of the series as a source of inspiration: Doctor Who was typically written while he listened to action-adventure film scores; Queer as Folk was written to Hi-NRG music "to catch [the] sheer clubland drive"; Bob & Rose was written to the Moby album Play, because the two works shared an "urban, sexy, full of lonely hearts at night" image; and The Second Coming shared the concepts of "experimental[ity], anguish, dark[ness], [and] pain" of Radiohead albums. More specifically, he wrote the early drafts of the fourth series Doctor Who episode "Partners in Crime" while he was listening to Mika's Life in Cartoon Motion, and singled out the song "Any Other World" as a "Doctor Who companion song" with lyrics that matched Penny, the planned companion for the fourth series.

When he creates new scripts, Davies considers the dénouement of a story to be representative of the work. He often formulates both the scene and its emotional impact early in the process, but writes the scenes last due to his belief that "[later scenes] can't exist if they aren't informed by where they've come from". Davies is a strong advocate for the continued use of the cliffhanger ending and opposes advertising that sacrifices the impact of storytelling. In pursuit of his quest, he instructs editors to remove scenes from press copies of episodes he writes; cliffhangers were removed from the review copies of the Doctor Who episodes "Army of Ghosts", "The Stolen Earth", and the first part of "The End of Time", and Rose Tyler's unadvertised appearance in "Partners in Crime" was excised. In an interview with BBC News shortly after the transmission of episode "The Stolen Earth", he argued that the success of a popular television series is linked to how well producers can keep secrets and create a "live experience":

Davies attempts to both create imagery and to provide a social commentary in his scripts; for example, he uses camera directions in his scripts more frequently than newer screenwriters to ensure that anyone who reads the script, especially the director, is able to "feel... the pace, the speed, the atmosphere, the mood, the gags, [and] the dread". His stage directions also create an atmosphere by their formatting and avoidance of the first person. Although the basis of several of his scripts derive from previous concepts, he claims most concepts for storytelling have been already used, and instead tries to tell a relatively new and entertaining plot; for example, the Doctor Who episode "Turn Left" shares its concept most notably with the 1998 film Sliding Doors. Like how Sliding Doors examines two timelines based on whether Helen Quilley (Gwyneth Paltrow) catches a London Underground train, Davies uses the choice of the Doctor's companion to turn left or right at a road intersection to depict either a world with the Doctor, as seen throughout the rest of the fourth series, or an alternate world without the Doctor, examined in its entirety within the episode. The world without the Doctor creates a dystopia which he uses to provide a commentary on Nazi-esque fascism. Davies generally tries to make his scripts "quite detailed, but very succinct", and eschews the long character and set descriptions; instead, he limits himself to only three adjectives to describe a character and two lines to describe a set to allow the dialogue to describe the story instead.

Davies also uses his scripts to examine and debate on large issues such as sexuality and religion, especially from a homosexual or atheist perspective. He refrains from a dependence on "cheap, easy lines" which provide little deeper insight; his mantra during his early adult drama career was "no boring issues". Queer as Folk is the primary vehicle for his social commentary of homosexuality and advocation of greater acceptance. He used the series to challenge the "primal ... gut instinct" of homophobia by introducing homosexual imagery in contrast to the heterosexual "fundamental image of life, of family, of childhood, [and] of survival". His next series, Bob & Rose, examined the issue of a gay man who falls in love with a woman, and the reaction of the couple's respective social circles. Torchwood, in Davies' own words, is "a very bisexual programme", and demonstrates a fluid approach to both gender and sexuality "almost from its opening moments": for example, the lead character Captain Jack Harkness nonchalantly mentions he was once pregnant; and later, the other lead characters discuss Jack's sexuality. The culture website AfterElton opined that Torchwoods biggest breakthrough could be "queer representation" by showing Captain Jack as a character whose bisexuality is explored but not his only character trait.

His most notable commentaries of religion and atheism are The Second Coming and his 2007 Doctor Who episode "Gridlock". The Second Comings depiction of a contemporary and realistic Second Coming of Jesus Christ eschews the use of religious iconography in favour of a love story underlined by the male lead's "awakening as the Son of God". In contrast, "Gridlock" takes a more pro-active role in debating religion: the episode depicts the unity of the supporting cast in singing the Christian hymns "Abide with Me" and "The Old Rugged Cross" as a positive aspect of faith, but depicts the Doctor as an atheistic hero which shows the faith as misguided because "there is no higher authority". He also includes his commentary as an undertone in other stories; he described the sub-plot of the differing belief systems of the Doctor and Queen Victoria in "Tooth and Claw" as a conflict between "Rational Man versus Head of the Church".

Like other script writers during Doctor Whos original tenure, several of Davies' scripts are influenced by his personal politics. Marc Edward DiPaolo of Oklahoma City University observes that Davies usually espouses a "left-leaning" view through his scripts. Beyond religion and sexuality, Davies most notably satirises the United States under George W. Bush on Doctor Who: the Slitheen in "Aliens of London" and "World War Three" and Henry van Statten in "Dalek" were portrayed as sociopathic capitalists; the Daleks under his tenure echoed contemporary American conservatives in their appearances, from religious fundamentalists in "The Parting of the Ways" to imperialists in "Daleks in Manhattan" and "Evolution of the Daleks"; and in "The Sound of Drums", a parody of Bush is murdered by the Master (John Simm), who was presented in the story as a Prime Minister reminiscent of Tony Blair. Other targets of satire in his Doctor Who scripts include Fox News, News Corporation, and the 24-hour news cycle in "The Long Game", plastic surgery and consumer culture in "The End of the World", obesity and alternative medicine in "Partners in Crime", and racism and paranoia in "Midnight".

Recognition

Davies has received recognition for his work since his career as a children's television writer. Davies' first BAFTA award nominations came in 1993 when he was nominated for the "Best Children's Programme (Fiction)" Television Award for his work on Children's Ward. Children's Ward was nominated for the Children's Drama award in 1996 and won the same award in 1997. His next critically successful series was Bob & Rose; it was nominated for a Television Award for Best Drama Serial and won two British Comedy Awards for Best Comedy Drama and Writer of the Year. The Second Coming was nominated for the same Television Award in 2004. His work on The Second Coming earned him a nomination for a Royal Television Society award.

Most of Davies' recognition came as a result of his work on Doctor Who. In 2005, Doctor Who won two Television Awards—Best Drama Series and the Pioneer Audience Award—and he was awarded the honorary Dennis Potter Award for writing. He also received that year's BAFTA Cymru Siân Phillips Award for Outstanding Contribution to Network Television. At the Edinburgh International Television Festival, he was awarded the accolade of "Industry Player of the Year" in 2006, and he was announced as recipient of the Outstanding Achievement Award in 2017. In 2007, Davies was nominated for the "Best Soap/Series" Writers' Guild of Great Britain Award—along with Chris Chibnall, Paul Cornell, Stephen Greenhorn, Steven Moffat, Helen Raynor, and Gareth Roberts—for their work on the third series of Doctor Who. He was again nominated for two BAFTA Awards in 2009: a Television Award for his work on Doctor Who, and the Television Craft Award for Best Writer, for the episode "Midnight". Davies was nominated three times for competitive BAFTA Cymru awards due to his work on Doctor Who: in 2006, he was nominated for Best Screenwriter for the whole series; in 2007, he won the same award for "Doomsday"; and in 2009, he won the award again for "Midnight".

Under his tenure, Doctor Who won five consecutive National Television Awards between 2005 and 2010. He has also been nominated for three Hugo Awards, all in the category of "Best Dramatic Presentation, Short Form": in 2007, the story comprising "Army of Ghosts" and "Doomsday" was defeated by Steven Moffat's "The Girl in the Fireplace"; in 2009, the episode "Turn Left" was defeated by Joss Whedon's Dr. Horrible's Sing-Along Blog; and in 2010, all three of his scripts which were eligible for the award, "The Next Doctor", the Davies–Roberts collaboration "Planet of the Dead", and the Davies–Ford collaboration "The Waters of Mars", were nominated: the award was won by "The Waters of Mars" and the other episodes took second and third place. His last nominations for working on the Doctor Who franchise came in 2010, when the first episode of Torchwood: Children of Earth was nominated for a BAFTA Cymru Award for Best Screenwriter, and in 2011 when The Sarah Jane Adventures was nominated by BAFTA for the Best Children's Drama award.

During Davies' tenure as executive producer, only Steven Moffat's "Silence in the Library", which was scheduled against the final of the second series of Britain's Got Talent, failed to win in its time slot. The show's viewing figures were consistently high enough that the only broadcasts to have consistently rivalled Doctor Who for viewers in the Broadcasters' Audience Research Board's weekly charts were EastEnders, Coronation Street, Britain's Got Talent, and international football matches. Two of his scripts, "Voyage of the Damned" and "The Stolen Earth", broke audience records for the show by being declared the second most viewed broadcasts of their respective weeks, and "Journey's End" became the first episode to be the most viewed broadcast of the week. The show enjoyed consistently high Appreciation Index ratings: "Love & Monsters", regarded by Doctor Who fans as his worst script, gained a rating of 76, just short of the 2006 average rating of 77; and the episodes "The Stolen Earth" and "Journey's End" share the highest rating Doctor Who has received, at 91.

Among Doctor Who fans, his contribution to the show ranks as high as the show's co-creator Verity Lambert: in a 2009 poll of 6,700 Doctor Who Magazine readers, he won the "Greatest Contribution" award with 22.62% of the votes against Lambert's 22.49% share, in addition to winning the magazine's 2005, 2006, and 2008 awards for the best writer of each series. Ian Farrington, who commented on the 2009 "Greatest Contribution" poll, attributed Davies' popularity to his range of writing styles, from the epic "Doomsday" to the minimalistic "Midnight", and his ability to market the show to appeal to a wide audience.

Davies' work on Doctor Who has led to accolades out of the television industry. He features in the Pinc List of leading Welsh LGBT figures.
Between 2005 and 2008, he was included in The Guardian "Media 100": in 2005, he was ranked the 14th most influential man in the media; in 2006, the 28th; in 2007, the 15th; and in 2008, the 31st. In 2008 he was ranked the 42nd most influential person in British culture by The Telegraph. The Independent on Sunday recognised his contributions to the public by including him on seven consecutive Pink Lists, which chronicle the achievements of gay and lesbian personalities: in 2005, he was ranked the 73rd most influential gay person; in 2006, the 18th; in 2007, the most influential gay person; in 2008, the 2nd; in 2009, the 14th; in 2010, the 64th; in 2011, the 47th; in 2012, the 56th; and in 2013, was listed as a permanent member of the List's "national treasures". Davies was appointed Officer of the Order of the British Empire in the 2008 Birthday Honours for services to drama, and an honorary fellowship by Cardiff University in July 2008.

Since his departure from Doctor Who, Davies has continued to receive recognition for his work: in 2016, Davies won a British Academy Craft Award in the category of "Best Writer: Drama" for Cucumber; in 2017, A Midsummer Night's Dream was nominated for BAFTA Cymru's "Best Feature/Television Film Award"; in 2019, A Very English Scandal was nominated for four awards—a British Academy Television Award for "Best Mini-Series", a British Academy Craft Award for "Best Writer: Drama", a British Academy Cymru Award for "Best Writer", and a Primetime Emmy Award for Outstanding Writing for a Limited Series, Movie, or Dramatic Special—and won the Cymru Award; and in 2020, Years and Years was nominated for the British Academy Cymru Award for "Best Writer". In July 2022, Davies was elected as a Fellow of the Royal Society of Literature for his contributions to television.

Personal life
Davies was in a relationship with Andrew Smith, a customs officer, between 1999 and Smith's death in 2018. They entered into a civil partnership on 1 December 2012, after Smith was diagnosed with a brain tumour from which he was given only a 3% chance of recovering. Smith died on 29 September 2018. Years and Years ends with a title card which dedicates the series to Smith.

Whilst being interviewed about It's a Sin on ITV Wales, Davies was asked if he was "indy-curious" about Welsh independence. He replied:

Production credits

Doctor Who franchise writing credits

Bibliography

Novels

Afterwords

Notes

References

External links

 
 

1963 births
20th-century British male writers
20th-century British writers
20th-century British screenwriters
20th-century Welsh writers
21st-century British screenwriters
21st-century British male writers
21st-century Welsh writers
Alumni of Worcester College, Oxford
BAFTA winners (people)
BBC television producers
Welsh gay writers
British science fiction writers
Hugo Award-winning writers
LGBT television producers
Welsh LGBT screenwriters
Living people
Officers of the Order of the British Empire
People educated at Olchfa School
People from Swansea
Showrunners
Welsh atheists
Welsh humanists
Welsh science fiction writers
Welsh screenwriters
Welsh television producers
Welsh television writers
Writers of Doctor Who novels